Erasto is a given name common in Tanzania, Mexico and the Caribbean. Notable people with the name include:

 Atiba Erasto Harris, Kittitian football administrator and former professional footballer.
 Erasto Andrew Mbwana Mang'enya, Tanzanian diplomat
 Erasto B. Mpemba, Tanzanian game warden
 Erasto Cortés Juárez, Mexican artist 
 Erasto Nyoni, Tanzanian footballer
 Erasto Sampson, sprinter
 Martín Erastos Torrijos, 35th president of Panama
 Raúl Erasto Gutiérrez, Mexican professional football manager and former player

Spanish-language surnames